Gustaf Holmström (27 November 1888 – 24 February 1970) was a Finnish footballer. He played in one match for the Finland national football team in 1911.

References

External links
 

1888 births
1970 deaths
Finnish footballers
Finland international footballers
Footballers from Helsinki
Association football goalkeepers
HIFK Fotboll players